Bengal Volunteers Corps was an underground revolutionary group against the British rule of India. The group was functional from its inception in 1928 to the Indian independence.

The beginning
Subhas Chandra Bose organised a group of volunteers during the 1928 Kolkata session of Indian National Congress.  The group was named Bengal Volunteers Corps and was under the leadership of Major Satya Gupta. Subhas Chandra Bose himself was the GOC. After the Calcutta session of the Congress was over, the Bengal Volunteers continued its activities, under the guidance of Satya Gupta, and was turned into an active revolutionary association.

Activities and notable members
Bengal Volunteers decided to launch 'Operation Freedom' in the early 1930s, primarily to protest against the police repression in different jails in Bengal. Notable members Bengal Volunteers include Benoy Basu, Badal Gupta and Dinesh Gupta.

Citations

References 

 
 
 
 
 
 
 

Bengal Presidency
Revolutionary movement for Indian independence
Subhas Chandra Bose